The Horta Football Association is one of the 22 District Football Associations that are affiliated with the Portuguese Football Federation. The AF Horta administers lower-tier football in the municipalities on the islands of Faial, Pico, Flores and Corvo, as well as those clubs registered in the islands.

History
The foundation of the Football Association of Horta was only possible after the founding of many of the football clubs that marked its history, and specifically the founding of the Fayal Sport Club, Angústias Atlético Clube and Sporting Club da Horta. Even in its early history, Horta was known as the "Azorean city of Sporting Excellence", and on 2 February 1909, the Fayal Sport Club was established by an enthusiastic group of students from the Liceu of Horta (its first President was Manuel Tânger). Since there were no other club on the island at the time, the Fayal Sport played against visiting foreign workers of the submarine cable companies, and in particular, the British Football Club. Although the events were well contested, the games themselves were friendly, with no organizational structure. Interest in association football was so popular that, in 1913, Fayal S.C. completed its first inter-island game in Ponta Delgada, winning the matches and tournament in the regional capital.

It took another 14 years before another team, the Sporting Club da Horta was founded on 28 May 1922, under the direction of its first president Domingos Homem Garcia. In the same year, Fayal S.C. invited Casa Pia, and its celebrated kicker Cândido de Oliveira for a match. This was a precursor to the founding of the 'Angústias Atlético Clube' (Angustias Athletic Club), was formed on 6 January 1923, under the direction of their first President Manuel Stattmiller de Saldanha e Albuquerque.

These changes and the growth of the popularity laid the seeds for the creation of the Football Association. In January 1924, the British Football Club proposed the "constitution of an Association" to begin operating almost immediately, while Fayal S.C. suggested that an association would be more practical in the proceeding season. Unfortunately, the three principal clubs did not intend in the formative period of the association's creation.

In 1928, there were contacts between clubs to organize an Azorean Championship. The three teams on Faial met on 21 October 1930, at the Grémio Literário Artista Fayalense in the Largo do Bispo represented by António de Sousa Ramos Jr. (Fayal Sport Club), Jaime Maria Soares de Melo (Angústias Atletico Club), and Manuel d'Azevedo Castro Neves (Sporting Clube da Horta), whom achieved a consensus to form the Asociação de Futebol da Horta.

Notable clubs
Historically, the following teams were important in the development of association football on the islands, and responsible for the founding of the Horta Football Association:

 Angústias AC
 FC Madalena
 SC Horta

Current Divisions - 2012–13 Season
The AF Horta runs the following division covering the fifth tier of the Portuguese football league system.
Faial/Pico
 Fayal Sport Clube
 Futebol Clube da Madalena 
 Futebol Clube dos Flamengos 
 Grupo Desportivo Cedrense 
 Grupo Desportivo do Salão 
 Vitória Futebol Clube

See also
 Portuguese District Football Associations
 Portuguese football competitions
 List of football clubs in Portugal

References 

Horta
Football in the Azores
Sports organizations established in 1930